Togo Telecom F.C. is a Togolese football club based in Lomé. They play in the top division in Togolese football. Their home stadium is Stade Général Eyadema.

Current squad

Football clubs in Togo
Football clubs in Lomé
Works association football teams